Natural Wild is a reggae album by Jamaican artist Lincoln Thompson and the Rasses released in 1980 and recorded in the United Kingdom. Joe Jackson collaborated on the album whose central theme was the promotion of the culture and morality of the Rastafari movement. Commercially the album was a flop in spite of widespread publicity for it in the UK, in contrast to Thompson's two previous albums.

Track listing
"Mechanical Devices"
"Natural Wild"
"My Generation"
"Natural (Reprise)"
"Spaceship"
"People's Minds"
"People Love Jah Music"
"Smiling Faces"

Personnel
Lincoln Thompson - guitar, vocals
Gary Sanford, Dougie Bryan, Willie Lindo - guitar
Bertram "Ranchie" McLean, Graham Maby - bass
Dave Houghton, Michael "Boo" Richards - drums
Joe Jackson - grand piano, organ, melodica
Ansel Collins - keyboards
George Oban, Mo Claridge - percussion
Tony Gad - synthesizer on "Spaceship"
Chris Lane - dub sound effects
Norman Mighell - engineer

1980 albums
Lincoln Thompson albums
United Artists Records albums